The Berkshire Botanical Garden, is a  botanical garden in Stockbridge, Massachusetts, United States. Its collections contain over 3,000 species and varieties, with an emphasis on plants that thrive in the Berkshires.

The Garden was founded in 1934 as the Berkshire Garden Center, and its public display gardens are among the oldest in the United States.

See also 
 List of botanical gardens in the United States

References

External links

Botanical gardens in Massachusetts
Stockbridge, Massachusetts
Protected areas of Berkshire County, Massachusetts
1934 establishments in Massachusetts
Protected areas established in 1934